Kangasjärvi is a small clear lake in Isojoki, Finland. It has camping ground and a small beach where people can sunbathe, swim or fish during the summer. There is also sauna, little shop and accommodation services available. At winter ice fishing and winter swimming is possible.

Fish
Whitefish are numerous fish, but there are also perches, pikes, graylings and eels.

See also
 Kangasjärven leirintäalue
 Isojoen Kalastuskunta
 Isojoki

Lakes of Isojoki